"Sweet City Woman" is a 1971 song by Canadian rock band The Stampeders, appearing on their debut album Against the Grain (retitled Sweet City Woman in the US). It features a banjo as a primary instrument, which is also mentioned in the lyrics: "The banjo and me, we got a feel for singing."

Chart performance
The single spent four weeks as a number 1 hit in Canada, and reached number 8 in the US. It also climbed to number 1 on the Canadian country music and adult contemporary charts. The song was also marketed in Canada by Quality Records with instrumental and French lyric versions.

Weekly charts

Year-end charts

Awards
The band and song won numerous Juno Awards in 1972, including Best Single, Songwriter of the Year (guitarist Rich Dodson), Record Producer of the Year (Mel Shaw), and the band was named Canada's Top Group.

Cover versions
The song has been covered by many musicians over the years, most notably:
American country music artist Johnny Carver, in 1977. Carver's version peaked at number 48 on the Billboard Hot Country Singles & Tracks charts.
Tompall & the Glaser Brothers, whose release went to number 34 on the same chart in 1980.

Use in media
The song can be heard during a flashback scene in the Better Call Saul episode "Inflatable," the Adam Sandler film Little Nicky, the Condor episode “Out of His Exile,” and in the Canadian commercial for "Dempster's Bread Farmer".

Personnel
 Produced by Mel Shaw
 Engineered by Terry Brown
 Recorded at Toronto Sound, Toronto, Ontario, Canada.
 Rich Dodson – vocal, banjo, lead electric guitar
 Ronnie King – bass
 Kim Berly – drums

References

External links
 Origin Stories: Rich Dodson on The Stampeders’ “Sweet City Woman” from JulietteJagger.com.

1971 singles
1977 singles
2008 singles
Franglais songs
Jo Hikk songs
Johnny Carver songs
The Stampeders songs
Tompall & the Glaser Brothers songs
RPM Top Singles number-one singles
1971 songs
Bell Records singles
Philips Records singles
Songs about New Orleans